Miss Perfumado is the fourth album by Cape Verdean vocalist Cesária Évora, released in 1992. It sold more than 300,000 copies worldwide. It included one of her most celebrated songs, "Sodade", composed by Armando Zeferino Soares.

Both the seventh song and the album are named after a song that was made by B. Leza. The sixth song, "Angola", composed by Ramiro Mendes, helped Évora to achieve her first gold record in France. That track would later be adapted into a 1997 single called "Pa Manyen", by former President of Haiti Michel Martelly, which later became a hit.

Track listing

Charts

Certifications

Singles

References

External links

"iTunes - Music - Miss Perfumado by Césaria Évora".  iTunes. retrieved 23 October 2014.

1992 albums
Cesária Évora albums